Anders Miolin (born 28 May 1961) is a concert guitarist performing on the 13-stringed guitar "Chiavi-Miolin".

Anders Miolin was born in Stockholm, Sweden, and entered the Royal Danish Academy of Music in Copenhagen at the early age of 15. He studied with the Karl Scheit pupil professor Per-Olof Johnson and graduated with a teaching and concert diploma. He continued his studies with Professor Johnson at the Music Academy in Malmö, Sweden, where he finished with a soloist diploma and obtained a second soloist diploma at the Music Academy in Basel, Switzerland, after three years of studies with the famous Andrés Segovia pupil Oscar Ghiglia.

Anders Miolin is a professor at the Zürich University of the Arts and gives concerts and master classes all over the world. He has recorded seven solo CDs for the internationally renowned label BIS Records and continues to be a very active concert and recording artist creating innovative and unorthodox programs. Together with the Zürich luthier Ermanno Chiavi he has developed the 13-stringed guitar “Chiavi-Miolin”.

References

External links
 Anders Miolin's official webpage
 Zürich University of the Arts
 Chiavi Guitars webpage
 BIS Records

1961 births
Living people
Royal Danish Academy of Music alumni
Swedish classical guitarists